The Men's individual pursuit competition at the 2020 UCI Track Cycling World Championships was held on 28 February 2020.

Results

Qualifying
The qualifying was started at 15:48. The first two racers raced for gold, the third and fourth fastest rider raced for the bronze medal.

Finals
The finals were started at 20:36.

References

Men's individual pursuit
UCI Track Cycling World Championships – Men's individual pursuit